MTFC can stand for:

 Macclesfield Town Football Club, an English football (soccer) club
 Mansfield Town Football Club, an English football (soccer) club
 Matlock Town Football Club, an English football (soccer) club
 Merthyr Tydfil Football Club a Welsh football (soccer) club
 Mildenhall Town Football Club, an English football (soccer) club
 Morpeth Town Football Club, an English football (soccer) club